The Reign of the Brown Magician (1996) is the final fantasy novel in The Worlds of Shadow trilogy by Lawrence Watt-Evans.

Plot introduction
By defeating the powerful wizard who runs a fantasy universe, a man from this world gains all of her powers. He sets about using these powers for the good of the world he is now effectively the ruler of and to fix what went wrong in the previous books.

Books
The Worlds of Shadow series:
 Out of This World (1993)
 In the Empire of Shadow (1995)
 The Reign of the Brown Magician (1996)

1996 American novels
American fantasy novels